Nysius fuscovittatus is a species of seed bug in the family Lygaeidae. It is found in North America.

References

Further reading

 

fuscovittatus
Articles created by Qbugbot
Insects described in 1958